Amit Khanna is an Indian film producer, director, writer, and journalist. He was the founder chairman of Reliance Entertainment, former president of the Producers Guild of India, and the founder trustee of the Mumbai Academy of the Moving Image. He is credited with having coined the term Bollywood. Khanna has also won three National Film Awards as a producer and lyricist.

Background 
He completed his higher education from St. Stephen’s College, Delhi. He has been involved with media since his school days at St. Columba's School, Delhi and has worked in theatre, radio, television, journalism, and films. Khanna began his career as an executive producer with actor-producer Dev Anand’s Navketan Films in 1971 and subsequently produced films such as Man Pasand, Sheeshay Ka Ghar and Shesh. He has also written over 400 film and non-film songs and several film scripts. He began actively working in television as a producer-director in the eighties and set up Plus Channel in 1990 which was India’s first entertainment conglomerate and the largest independent producer of TV programmes. He left Plus as its Managing Director to launch Reliance Entertainment. His other achievements include editing the magazines Tempus and Take-2 and writing in various magazines and newspapers. He has served on the Central Board of Film Certification and the Film Import Selection Committee, as a vice president of the Film Producers Guild of India and has been on the committees of the Indian Broadcasting Foundation, Indian Music Industry and Film Federation of India. He helped found the Mumbai Academy of the Moving Image.

Organisations
Amit Khanna is the only permanent member of the Council of Management of the Producers Guild of India (the two others were V. Shantaram and Raj Kapoor). He has participated as a keynote speaker for Federation of Indian Chambers of Commerce & Industry  (FICCI), NASSCOM, Confederation of Indian Industries (CII), and ECO, and served on over 50 international government committees and trade organizations and institutions.

Writings
Presently retired from all film activities and organisational responsibilities, Amit Khanna devotes all his time solely to writing.

Filmography

Khanna started his film career as executive producer with Dev Anand's Navketan Films in 1971. In 1989 Khanna helped set up Plus Channel, a television programming house, and joined it as managing director and Group Editor. Under his tenure, the organization expanded its role to produce movies and music, and provide event management services. Several films created under the Plus Films banner went on to win National Film Awards. In 1996 Khanna won two awards as film producer at the 44th National Film Awards: Best Feature Film in Hindi for Gudia and Best Feature Film in Urdu for Sardari Begum. Plus Channel produced India's earliest audio books in both prose and verse. It also pioneered business news shows on Indian television.

In 2000 Khanna resigned from Plus Channel to join Reliance Entertainment where he served as chairman for 15 years. Under his guidance, Reliance Entertainment became a major player in Hollywood. In May 2008 the company signed deals to produce and develop movies with prominent Hollywood actors such as Tom Hanks, Brad Pitt, George Clooney, Jim Carrey and Nicolas Cage. In September 2008 Reliance Entertainment formed a joint venture with Steven Spielberg's DreamWorks SKG named DreamWorks Studios via an equity investment of $325 million. In August 2009 Reliance Entertainment signed an $825 million production and distribution deal with DreamWorks Studios.

Films

TV series

As a lyricist he has penned over 200 Hindi film songs, working mainly with music directors like Bappi Lahiri, Rajesh Roshan and Laxmikant–Pyarelal. He also composed lyrics for around 200 songs released in music albums by singers Nazia and Zoheb Hassan, Sharon Prabhakar, Salma Agha, Nusrat Fateh Ali Khan, Mahendra Kapoor and Shafqat Ali Khan. In 1984 he directed three music videos for Nazia Hassan's music album Young Tarang. He was the lyricist for the opening theme song of ten Indian television series, including Buniyaad (1986), Dekh Bhai Dekh (1993) and Swabhimaan (1995).

Other

Awards and honours
Time, Newsweek, Variety and The Hollywood Reporter have mentioned him as one of the global leaders of film and television. He has been a guest lecturer at New York University and the University of Southern California. He was on the selection panel of the Indian Panorama (Western region) thrice (1985, 1989, and 1993). and was the first Indian to serve on the International Emmys jury.

References

External links
Official website
Amit Khanna at IMDb
Amit Khanna at The Wire
Amit Khanna at Daily O
Amit Khanna at Open (Indian magazine)
Amit Khanna at Jaipur Literature Festival
Amit Khanna at Kautik International Student Film Festival
Amit Khanna at Film Critics Circle of India
Amit Khanna at Producers Guild of India

Living people
1951 births
Writers from Delhi
St. Columba's School, Delhi alumni
St. Stephen's College, Delhi alumni
Hindi-language lyricists
Hindi film producers
Indian television producers
Indian television executives
Best Lyrics National Film Award winners
National Film Award (India) winners